Dr Nirmala Visweswara Rao (born 29 May 1969) is a classical dancer in kuchipudi and Bharathanatyam

Early life
She was born to the Kamana Ramchandar Rao and Seetha Maha Lakshmi. She started learning dance at the age of 10 years from his Guru Chinta Rammurthy married Kadimi visweswara Rao in April 1988. With the encouragement of his husband she completed her Degree, M.A and MPhil in Dance. She learned from Pasupathi Rama linga satry Garu and continued her career. She started an institute Nirmala Nrutya Nikethan in the year 1998 Recognized by Government of A.P and by the Cultural Arts of India.

Career
Education Qualifications

She has multiple qualifications which include a B.A. from (Andhra University), Certificate Course in Dance from (Telugu University), MPA in Dance from (Central University), M.Phill from PS Telugu University, Hyderabad and a Ph.D. in Fine Arts(Kuchipudi & Garaga Nrutyam)from P.S Telugu University Hyd,India.(2011).

Her child performances (from her 8th year of school and onwards) established the commencement of her career. These included; Pushpanjali, Manduka Shabdam and Ramapattabishekam. At the age of 13 she won a gold medal, for a performing competition and in 1994 she finally emerged as a professional.

Since then Nirmala has had the opportunity to perform at a variety of different platforms including; 
   Andhra Pradesh					
	Ravindra Bharati
	Tyagaraya Ganasabha
	Hari Hara Kala Bhavanam
	Lalitha Kalathoranam, 
	Shilparamam 
	Shilpakala Vedika, Lal Bahadur Stadium
	Sundariah Vignana Kendra
	Indira Priyadarshini Auditorium.
	City Central Library and all other prestigious platforms in Hyderabad.
   Delhi : Third World Telugu Federation (Siri Fort Auditorium)
   West Bengal: Siliguri Utsav - Siliguri

Some cities she has performed in include; Maharashtra, Tamil Nadu, Orissa (Konark Festival), Vijayawada, Guntur, Visakhapatnam, Tirupathi, Kadapa, Nellore, Bhadrachalam, Gadwal, Pune and Bhuvaneswar.

International Performances and Achievements

International Performances				

Nirmala has performed internationally in; Poland, Turkey, Balgeria, Austria, Sri Lanka, Malahsia, Singapore, Mauritius, Doha Qatar, Muscut, Dubai and Bahrain.

Ballets

She has performed in ballets which include;

	Mohini Bhasmasura		-	Credential as Mohini <ref name="Newspaper" 
	Shakuntala Parinayam		-	Credential as Shakuntala 
	Ananda Thandavam		-	Credential as Parvathi 
	Gajananeeyam			-	Credential as Lakshmi
	Sasirekha Parinayam		- 	Credential as Narthaki
	Sri Rama Katha Saram		-	Credential as Narthaki
	Khsamaya Dharithri		-	Credential as Khsamaya Dharitri
	Sree Rama Dasu Charitra	-	Credential as Sita
	Dasavataram			-	In-corination of Lord Vishnu
	Nava Durga Mahotsavam	-	Credential as Durga
	Sree Krishna Vilasam		-	Credential as Radha
	Ruthu Shobha			-	Credential as Prakruthi Matha			 					(Goddess of Nature)
	"Bharateeya Nritya Jhari"	-	All India Classical Dances (or) Dances of India.
	Lakuma Swantan		-	Credential as Rani.

Awards and Achievements

She holds a range of achievements which include;

	"NATYA KALA VIDWANMANI" from All India Telugu Association – Doha Kattar on 9 May 2008.
	Nrutya Kaumudi from Manoranajani – Statewide Organization – 23 June 2003.
	"Best Dancer"  award from Telugu Association – Mascut
	" Best Dancer " award from 6th Global International Shopping Festival on 6 June 2008.
	"Golden" award from Telugu Association in Malaysia for Golden Jubilee Celebration.
	Samskara Bharathi – All India Level Organization (Akhila Bharatha Nruthya Utsavam).
	Received memento for excellent performance in Ugadi celebrations from C Rangarajan the Hon’ble Governor of Andhra Pradesh.
	Received Cine Goers award – from Dr. Akkineni Nageswara Rao, (Dada Sahem Phalke award winner).
	Ugadi  ;puraskara award from various cultural organizations such as Abhinanandana of Hyderabad.
	Received Best Youth Classical Dancer Award in 6 Dec. 2003 from Abhinaya Nrutya Bharathi – Eluru.
	Received "Natya Siromani" award from Aaradhana – A statewide organization on 5 Feb 2004. 
	Participated in 10th Youth Festival in Hyderabad on 25.02.2005.

Activities and Various Solo Presentations

She has participated in a variety of activities, performances and given solo presentations, which include;

	Shabdas a) Devotional, b) Traditional praising
	Tarangalu
	Javalies
	Padam / Padalu / Padavarnam
	Kirthanas – written by Annamacharya and Tyagaraju
	Slokas
	Siva Sthuthi and Sivastama
	Jathi Swaram / Thillanas
	Astapadulu.
	Vaggeyakara festival in Bhadrachalam in 2002 & 2005.
	Performed in Kinnera Arts Theatre Andhra Pradesh "Natyasavalu" from 10 November to 7 December 2005.
	Performed in Singapore Telugu Culture Festival in 2006.
	Participated in Space Women's Association (SWAS) celebrated International Women's Day on 8 March 2007 at Brahmprakash Hall, SHAR CENTER as Chief Guest of the Function.
	Participated in Andhra Day Celebration in Mauritius on 25 October to 1 November 2007.
	Participated in Andhra Association Cultural programme in Pune on 23 August 2008.
	Performed during Ganesh Festival in "SHAR CENTER (ISRO)" on 4 September 2008.
	Performed in Administration Staff College of India (ASCI), Khairatabad, Hyderabad.

References

External links
Gov website
Deccan Herald
bio
blog

Living people
1969 births
Kuchipudi exponents
Indian female classical dancers
Andhra University alumni
Bharatanatyam exponents
Performers of Indian classical dance
Dancers from Andhra Pradesh